Alex Wilson (born 19 September 1990 in Kingston, Jamaica) is a Swiss sprinter of Jamaican origin. He finished third at the 2018 European Championships in the 200 metres event.

Career
In 2010 he competed in the 200 metres at the 2010 European Athletics Championships, finishing in 8th place out of 8 sprinters in Heat 2 of Round 1, failing to advance to the Semifinals, with a time of 21.40. In 2011 he ran a Swiss under-23 record of 20.51 in the 200m to qualify for the 2011 World Championships in Daegu, where he failed to advance from his heat.  He was part of the Swiss team for the 2012 Summer Olympics, competing in the 200 metres where he progressed to the semi-final stage and finished 7th in the second semi-finals run. Also he made the semi-finals of the 200m in the 2012 European championships. He is a national record holder for outdoor 100, 150, 200 m events. At the 2016 European championships in Amsterdam, Wilson made the 200m and 4x100m finals though came away without any silverware. The same can be said for the 2014 European championships where Alex made the final of the 4x100m but only finished 4th. But in 2018 he won his first major medal when he finished 3rd in the 200m at the 2018 European championships in Berlin.  He also made the semifinal of the 2017 World championships in London in both the 200m and the 100m.

He has competed in 1 Olympic games, 3 World Championships and 5 European Championships over the course of his career.

On 15 March 2021 Wilson tested positive for trenbolone and its metabolites by the Swiss Anti-Doping Agency. In July the Court of Arbitration for Sport upheld the March test results, and Wilson missed the 2020 Summer Olympics in Tokyo. During the same year, he set disputed marks of 9.84 and 19.89 in Marietta, Georgia, neither of which were upheld.

References

External links

 

1990 births
Living people
Swiss male sprinters
Athletes (track and field) at the 2012 Summer Olympics
Olympic athletes of Switzerland
Jamaican male sprinters
World Athletics Championships athletes for Switzerland
Sportspeople from Kingston, Jamaica
European Championships (multi-sport event) bronze medalists
European Athletics Championships medalists
Naturalised citizens of Switzerland
Swiss people of Jamaican descent
Sportspeople of Jamaican descent
Doping cases in athletics
Swiss sportspeople in doping cases